Coatesia is a genus of plant containing the single species Coatesia paniculata, commonly known as axe-breaker or capivi, and is endemic to eastern Australia. It is a small, evergreen tree with simple, elliptical to egg-shaped leaves, panicles of white flowers on the ends of branchlets or in leaf axils and fused follicles with one black seed in each follicle.

Description
The leaves are glabrous, the upper surface glossy dark green and the lower surface paler, and are strongly fragrant when crushed.

Taxonomy
The genus Coatesia and the species Coatesia paniculata were first formally described in 1862 by Ferdinand von Mueller in his book Fragmenta phytographiae Australiae. , Plants of the World Online treated the genus as a synonym of Geijera, but it is accepted in a 2021 classification of the family Rutaceae, and placed in the subfamily Zanthoxyloideae.

Distribution and habitat
Coatesia paniculata grows in rainforest, often dry rainforest, and occurs from Mount Abbot near Bowen in central-eastern Queensland and south to north-eastern New South Wales.

Conservation status
This tree is listed as of "least concern" under the Queensland Government Nature Conservation Act 1992 but as "endangered" under the New South Wales Government Biodiversity Conservation Act 2016. The species is only known from a few locations near Tweed Heads, Lismore and Wardell in New South Wales and is threatened by land clearing, weed invasion and grazing by domestic livestock.

References

paniculata
Monotypic Rutaceae genera
Flora of New South Wales
Flora of Queensland
Taxa named by Ferdinand von Mueller
Zanthoxyloideae genera